King's Highway 95, commonly referred to as Highway 95, was a provincially maintained highway in the Canadian province of Ontario on Wolfe Island. Together with Highway 96, the routes were the only King's Highways not connected to the rest of the network by a fixed link. At its southern end, the  route connected to New York State Route 12E via the private and seasonal Horne's Ferry. At its northern end, it connected with Highway96 in Marysville a short distance west of the MV Wolfe Islander III ferry to Kingston. Today it is under the jurisdiction of Frontenac Islands Township, as Frontenac County does not have a county road system.

Route description 
At its southern end at Point Alexandria, the route connected with New York State Route12E at Cape Vincent via the private summer-operated Horne's Ferry. The route travelled west from there, sandwiched between Button Bay to the north and the Saint Lawrence River to the south. At Stevenson Lane, the route made a broad curve to the north. From there it crossed the island to Marysville, where it encountered Highway96 and the summer ferry dock for the Wolfe Islander III.
Unlike the private ferry service at the southern tip of the island, the MV Wolfe Islander III is operated by the Ministry of Transportation and can be used free of charge.
Beside the ferry services, there is no other link between Wolfe Island and the mainland, making the two routes on the island the only King's Highways that were not connected to the rest of the network by a fixed link.

History 
Highway95 was established on July25, 1934, when the Department of Highways, predecessor to the modern Ministry of Transportation, assumed the road connecting Point Alexandria to Marysville and the Wolfe Island Ferry.
At that time, it was the only highway on the island; Highway96 was established the following year.
The entire route was decommissioned on January, 1998.
It was subsequently transferred to Frontenac County, which does not maintain a county road system.
The county transferred the route to the municipality of Frontenac Islands, which designated it as Road95.

Major intersections

See also
List of numbered roads in Frontenac County

References 

Footnotes

095
1934 establishments in Ontario
1998 disestablishments in Ontario